The Norwalk River is a river in southwestern Connecticut, United States, approximately  long. The word "Norwalk" comes from the Algonquian word "noyank" meaning "point of land".

Description

The Norwalk River originates in ponds located in Ridgefield, Connecticut. These ponds empty into Ridgefield’s approximately  "Great Swamp". The river continues through Ridgefield, and is augmented by the "Great Pond" ( above sea level), one of the purest lakes in Connecticut due to its being fed by underwater springs. The river is closely paralleled by U.S. Route 7 as it flows southward through Branchville, Georgetown, Wilton, and Norwalk, where it is joined by the Silvermine River and then flows into Norwalk Harbor and finally into Long Island Sound.

Recreational fishing continues to be a popular sport along the course of the river, in addition to oystering at the river’s mouth in Norwalk.

A 20-year-old man drowned in the river on May 24, 2009 while trying to save a boy who slipped into a strong current near Broad Street in northern Norwalk, near the Route 7 Connector. The boy had been playing in knee-deep water. Jose Higareda, a Mexican immigrant living in Norwalk, jumped in the water with the boy's father, but Higareda was himself dragged downstream toward Deering Pond. The boy survived.

Great Flood of 1955

Over the weekend of October 14–17, 1955,  of tropical storm rain caused the Norwalk River, along with many other Connecticut rivers, to severely flood. (The statewide destruction prompted President Eisenhower to declare a disaster area in Connecticut.) The flood of 1955 caused the most severe damage of any flood in the history of Norwalk. From the heavy rains some dams along the Norwalk River broke, sending walls of water surging downstream, knocking out bridges and additional dams. Many of the Norwalk River’s neighboring towns and communities suffered widespread devastation. Several people died in addition to millions of dollars worth of damage along the Norwalk River watershed alone.

Pictures

See also

List of rivers of Connecticut

References

External links
The Norwalk River Watershed Association

Geography of Norwalk, Connecticut
Rivers of Fairfield County, Connecticut
Connecticut placenames of Native American origin
Long Island Sound
Rivers of Connecticut
Redding, Connecticut